Daniel Howell (born 11 June 1991) and Phil Lester (born 30 January 1987) are an English entertainment and business duo known for their collaborative work since they met in 2009 on YouTube, television and radio presenting, books, tours, and original films.

YouTube
Lester uploaded his first video on his channel, AmazingPhil, in March 2006 and Howell on his, at the time danisnotonfire, in October 2009. The same month Howell uploaded his first YouTube video, Dan and Phil met in person and created their first collaboration, a truth-or-dare style Q&A video Phil is not on fire on Lester's channel, which became a 10-part series with one installment uploaded a year. Since then, Dan and Phil have frequently appeared in videos on each other's channels.

In 2010, Dan and Phil took part in the live, annual 24-hour internet broadcast "Stickaid", a fundraiser for charity UNICEF.

Dan and Phil appeared in Benjamin Cook's twelve part 2012 web series Becoming YouTube, and was interviewed on the various topics Cook covered.

On 1 April 2015, Dan and Phil launched a spin-off crafts-based channel, DanAndPhilCRAFTS, as an April Fools joke. It featured a single video of them creating square snowflakes out of paper, with an amateur editing style and humour throughout. It reached over 154,000 subscribers and 500,000 total video views in one week. Additional videos were uploaded on April Fool's Day in 2016 and 2017.

On 13 June 2019, Dan posted a video on his channel where he came out as gay, and he talked about his experiences growing up in the 90s. Phil came out by tweet the same day. At the end of June, Phil also made a coming out video where he went into more detail than in his tweet.

The Super Amazing Project
In 2011, Dan and Phil created a collaborative YouTube channel through the network My Damn Channel. Titled The Super Amazing Project, it featured the duo discussing and investigating paranormal events. Segments included "Viewers Spooky Happenings", where the audience of the show would send in "scary" items for the video bloggers to react to, and "In The News This Week", where the duo recapped recent light-hearted news items and viral videos. In October 2014, it was announced that as of that month Dan and Phil would not carry on working on The Super Amazing Project in order to concentrate on their Radio 1 show. Dan and Phil later announced that the Super Amazing Project would be hosted by new presenters, Alastair James Murder and Victoria Atkin, found by channel owners My Damn Channel.

DanAndPhilGAMES
On 12 September 2014, Dan and Phil posted the first video on their new gaming YouTube channel, DanAndPhilGAMES. On 8 March 2015 the channel hit 1 million subscribers. It was officially the fastest growing channel on YouTube. DanAndPhilGAMES reached over 3.1 million subscribers. Popular recurring and annual series on this channel include their Sims 4 and Google Feud series, Spooky Week, and Gamingmas. As of their most recent upload in December 2018, the channel is on an indefinite hiatus.

Radio

In November 2012, the BBC announced that from January 2013 onwards, Dan and Phil would present the Sunday night entertainment and request show for national UK radio station BBC Radio 1. The duo had occasionally worked with Radio 1 before, making videos for the station's YouTube channel and presenting two Christmas broadcasts.

The show was designed to be an interactive, audio-visual broadcast involving music videos made by viewers, physical challenges performed on air by Dan and Phil, and song requests from listeners. It was streamed in a video, live on the BBC Radio 1 website, and accessible worldwide.

In August 2014, it was announced that the last Dan and Phil show would be broadcast on 24 August, with the duo moving to a different show on Monday nights, featuring other popular video bloggers. This new show was titled The Internet Takeover, and featured Lester alongside Howell live on the first Monday of every month, before coming to an end in April 2016.

Television and film
In 2013, Dan and Phil appeared on Friday Download, a BAFTA award-winning CBBC TV show.

From 2014 to 2016, Dan and Phil hosted the worldwide YouTube livestream of the Brit Awards as well as making backstage videos for their channel.

In 2015, Dan and Phil had voice cameo appearances in the UK cinema release of Walt Disney Animation Studios' Big Hero 6 as Technician 1 & 2.  However, this version is not in the UK home release. That same year, the duo also guest-starred in fellow YouTuber PJ Liguori's online series Oscar's Hotel for Fantastical Creatures, voicing anthropomorphic food items Brie and Rash.

In December 2016, Dan and Phil voiced two gorilla princes named Majinuni and Hafifu respectively, in the episode "The Lost Gorillas" in Disney Junior's The Lion Guard.

Business ventures

IRL Merch
In 2014, Phil Lester's brother, Martyn, co-founded IRL Digital, Ltd., a company that creates and sells the merchandise of various other media personalities, starting with Dan and Phil Shop and branching out from there.

Games
In August 2015, Dan and Phil created an app, The 7 Second Challenge, based on a YouTube challenge started by Lester in a 2014 video on his main channel. The app was discontinued in 2019. In October 2017, the duo released a party board game via Big Potato, Truth Bombs, also the brainchild of Lester.

Books, tours, and original films

The Amazing Book Is Not on Fire and The Amazing Tour Is Not on Fire
On 26 March 2015, Dan and Phil announced via a trailer on Howell's channel that they had co-written a book titled The Amazing Book Is Not on Fire (TABINOF). It was released in the UK on 8 October 2015 and worldwide on 15 October 2015, published by Ebury Press and Random House Children's Books. The book topped the General Hardbacks Sunday Times Bestsellers list having sold 26,745 copies in the UK in the first week of its release. It also became a #1 New York Times Bestseller in the young adult hardcover list.

In the same trailer the pair announced their theatrical stage show The Amazing Tour Is Not on Fire (TATINOF), which travelled around the UK during October and November 2015, ending with a show at the London Palladium. During the tour, they sung original song "The Internet Is Here", which they later released as a charity single for Stand Up To Cancer, earning them a gold record disc for the sales of the song.

In 2016, they took the tour to the US and Toronto, starting with a show in Orlando, Florida on 22 April and ended on 24 June with a show at the Dolby Theatre in Hollywood, California. It was the largest tour ever achieved by YouTube creators. They later toured Australia in August 2016, starting in Perth and ending in Brisbane, and finished the tour with a European leg, performing in Stockholm, Berlin, and Dublin.

YouTube Red Originals and Dan and Phil Go Outside
In October 2016, The Amazing Tour Is Not on Fire was released as a YouTube Red Original film by the same name along with a documentary, Dan and Phil's Story of TATINOF. They are the first British YouTube creators to release content on the YouTube Red platform.

Alongside these films, they released a photo book, Dan and Phil Go Outside, in November 2016, which includes a personal collection of candid photos and insightful stories from the tour. The book became a #1 New York Times bestseller.

Interactive Introverts
In November 2017, Dan and Phil announced their second tour, Interactive Introverts, a world tour that took place in 2018. The tour ran from April, starting in Brighton, to September, ending in Mumbai, and included 80 shows in 18 countries, making it one of the biggest YouTuber tours of all time.

Dan and Phil partnered with BBC Studios' TalentWorks to release a movie of Interactive Introverts with bonus features, such as behind the scenes content and director's commentary, on DVD, Blu-ray, and available for digital download in December 2018.

Background
Dan and Phil met on the Internet in 2009 and in person that October. They have lived together since August 2011, first in Manchester before moving to London in July 2012. In June 2019, Howell revealed that the two have been romantically involved but did not discuss their current relationship status, stating "I'm somebody that wants to keep the details of my personal life private. So is Phil."

Awards and nominations

References

 
Gaming YouTubers
English comedy duos
LGBT YouTubers
20th-century English LGBT people
21st-century English LGBT people
1991 births
Living people